Airolo railway station is a railway station in the Swiss canton of Ticino and municipality of Airolo. The station is on the original line of the Swiss Federal Railways Gotthard railway, at the southern entrance to the Gotthard Tunnel. Most trains on the Gotthard route now use the Gotthard Base Tunnel and do not pass through Airolo station.

The station has three platform tracks, served by a side platform and an island platform, connected by a pedestrian subway. The station building, on the side platform, includes a kiosk and a ticket office, but is largely given over to a manufacturer of local yogurts. Just outside the station entrance is a memorial to the lives lost during the construction of the Gotthard Tunnel.

Services 
 the following services stop at Airolo:

 Gotthard Panorama Express: daily tourist oriented service between Lugano and Arth-Goldau, with connecting boat service on Lake Lucerne to Lucerne.

Bus services operated by Autopostale terminate in front of the station, and include an hourly service to Bellinzona that parallels the railway, together with a less frequent route across the Novena Pass to Oberwald.

Gallery

References

External links 
 
 

Railway stations in Ticino
Swiss Federal Railways stations
Airolo